Domenico Brescia (1866–1939) was an Italian composer who taught in Chile and Ecuador, then became known in the United States for writing chamber music as well as musical accompaniment for dramatic performances. Brescia led the Music Theory department at Mills College.

Brescia was born in Pirano, near Trieste in 1866, at a time when the area was part of the Austrian Empire. After studying at the University of Bologna he became a member of the Royal Academy of Bologna as well the Royal Academy of Florence.

Brescia went to Santiago, Chile to teach harmony at the national conservatory, and eventually became the assistant director of the school. There, he met Ulderico Marcelli who was studying violin, brass and composition. In 1903, Brescia followed Marcelli to Quito, Ecuador to become the director of the conservatory there, picking up some of sour-tempered Marcelli's unhappy students. Brescia was the first Western composer to utilize native Ecuadorean elements in his works, including the successful Sinfonia Ecuatoriana. Brescia influenced two students who would later make names for themselves in Ecuadorian contemporary music: Segundo Luis Moreno and Luis H. Salgado. Marcelli left for San Francisco in 1910 and, due to Ecuador's increasing political unrest, Brescia left the country in 1911. By 1914, he had settled in San Francisco teaching voice and composing music.

In 1919, Brescia wrote the musical accompaniment to Life, a Grove Play performed at the Bohemian Grove. Ecuadorian Indian moods were used in two musical numbers. Brescia wrote in the notes to the score that he thought it was the first time that a chromatic set of cowbells, spanning an octave and a half, had been used as a symphony instrument. Brescia brought Marcelli into the Bohemian Club where Marcelli wrote the music for the next year's Grove Play. In 1926, Brescia worked with writer George Sterling to compose the music for Sterling's Grove Play entitled Truth.

In 1921, Brescia's Dithyrambic Suite for woodwind quintet premiered at Elizabeth Sprague Coolidge's Berkshire Chamber Music Festival, with the performance featuring flautist Georges Barrère. Reviewer Carl H. Tollefsen commented on the name Dithyrambic, writing "After hearing the music and in order to link my recollections of it with the title, I decided that the words 'Did he ramble' would bring back both. I'll say he did."

In 1925, Brescia moved to Oakland as professor of music composition at Mills College. He headed the music theory department as well. In 1928, Mills completed a new music building which was dedicated with a premier performance of Brescia's suite for piano and woodwinds. Brescia brought with him the favor of Elizabeth Sprague Coolidge, patron to modern chamber music, who subsequently subsidized various music department activities at Mills. Brescia held his professorship until his death in 1939.

Brescia had one daughter, Emma (1902–1968), who was married to American poet Robert Penn Warren during the period 1930–1951, then earned a Ph.D. from Columbia University in 1957 and began teaching foreign language at Mitchell College in New London, Connecticut, in 1963.

Works
1900s - Sinfonia Ecuatoriana
1919 - Life, a Grove Play
1921 - Dithyrambic Suite for woodwind quintet
1922 - Second Suite for Flute, Oboe, Clarinet, Horn, and Bassoon
1926 - Truth, a Grove Play
1928 - Suite for Flute, Oboe, Clarinet, Horn, Bassoon and Piano
1931 - Ricercare (quasi Fantasia) e Fuga per Organo
1937 - String quartet no. 6 (copyright June 15, 1937)
Twelve Two Part Inventions for the Pianoforte in Retrograde Inverse Canon

References

1866 births
1939 deaths
University of Bologna alumni
Italian composers
Italian male composers
Italian emigrants to the United States